The men's dual moguls competition of the FIS Freestyle World Ski Championships 2013 was held at Myrkdalen-Voss, Norway on March 7 (qualifying)  and March 8 (finals). 
51 athletes from 18 countries competed.

Results

Qualification
The following are the results of the qualification.

Final
The following are the results of the final.

References

Dual Moguls, men's